Ingrid G. Gustafson (born December 11, 1961) is an associate justice of the Montana Supreme Court. She was appointed in December 2017 by Governor Steve Bullock to fill the seat of retiring Justice Mike Wheat.  She grew up primarily in Billings, Montana, where she returned to work in private practice and then became a District Judge for Montana's 13th Judicial District, Yellowstone County prior to her appointment to the state Supreme Court.

Background
Gustafson was born in Wyoming and moved to Montana in 1972, where she graduated from Billings West High School in 1979. Attending Montana State University on a skiing scholarship, she graduated in 1983.  She obtained her law degree from the University of Montana Law School in 1988.

Gustafson worked for the Social Security Administration for two years, and entered private practice in 1991. In that period, she also was a public defender in Rosebud County, Montana. From 1996 until 2004 she was a managing partner at the law firm Graves, Toennis and Gustafson in Billings, Montana.

Gustafson was appointed as District Judge of Montana's 13th Judicial District by former Governor Judy Martz, and took the bench in 2004. She succeeded retiring District Judge and former Montana Supreme Court justice Diane Barz. She was re-elected to the bench in 2004, 2006 and 2012. Gustafson helped create Yellowstone County's drug court in 2010.

References 

1961 births
Living people
21st-century American judges
21st-century American women judges
Justices of the Montana Supreme Court
Montana lawyers
People from Laramie, Wyoming
University of Montana alumni
Public defenders